Clint is both a given name and a surname. Notable people with the name include:

Given name:
Clint Alberta (1970–2002), Canadian filmmaker
Clint Albright (1926–1999), Canadian ice hockey player
Clint Alfino (born 1968), South African baseball player
Clint Amos (born 1983), Australian rugby league player
Clint Auty (born 1969), Australian cricketer
Clint Bajada (born 1982), Maltese presenter
Clint Barmes (born 1979), American baseball player 
Clint Benedict (born 1892), Canadian ice hockey goaltender
Clint Black (born 1962), American country singer and musician
Clint Boon (born 1959), English musician and radio presenter
Clint Boulton (1948–2021), English footballer
Clint Bowyer (born 1979), NASCAR racecar driver
Clint Capela (born 1994), Swiss basketball player
Clint Catalyst (born 1971), American author, actor, model, and spoken word performer
Clint Daniels (born 1974), American singer
Clint Dempsey (born 1983), American soccer player
Clint Eastwood (born 1930), American actor and director
Clint Fagan (born 1952), American baseball umpire
Clint Ford (born 1976), American voiceover artist and actor
Clint Frazier (born 1994), American baseball player
Clint Freeman (born 1973), Australian archer
Clint Hill (disambiguation), several people
Clint Hocking (born 1972), Canadian video game director and designer
Clint Holmes (born 1946), American singer and entertainer
Clint Howard (born 1959), American actor 
Clint Hurdle (born 1957), American baseball manager 
Clint Arlen Lauderdale (1932–2009), American diplomat
Clint Lorance (born 1984), American Army officer convicted of second-degree murder for battlefield deaths; pardoned
Clint Malarchuk (born 1961), Canadian ice hockey player
Clint Mansell (born 1963), English musician and composer
Clint McElroy (born 1955), American podcaster and former radio personality
Clint McKay (born 1983), Australian cricketer
Clint Robinson (baseball) (born 1985), American baseball player
Clint Robinson (canoeist) (born 1972), Austrian canoeist
Clint Stickdorn (born 1982), American football player
Clint Trickett (born 1991), American football player
Clint Walker (1927–2018), American actor and singer

Surname:
Alfred Clint (1807–1883), English marine painter
Alfred Clint (Australian painter) (1843–1923), cartoonist and theatrical scene painter
Alf Clint (1906-1980), Australian Anglican priest and co-operative organizer
Edmund Thomas Clint (born 1976), Indian artistic child prodigy
George Clint (1770–1854), English portrait painter and engraver
Scipio Clint (1805–1839), English medallist and seal-engraver

English masculine given names